Maulana Amanat Shah Haqqani is a Pakistani politician from Mardan District who served as member of the Khyber Pakhtunkhwa Assembly. As of 2020, he is serving as General secretary of Jamiat Ulema-e-Islam (F) Mardan.

In December 2021, he also ran in the local elections for mayor of Mardan.

References

Living people
People from Mardan District
Jamiat Ulema-e-Islam (F) politicians
Year of birth missing (living people)